Sir Richard John Randall (13 October 1906 – 15 November 1982) was a senior Australian public servant. He was Secretary of the Department of the Treasury between October 1966 and October 1971.

Life and career
Dick Randall was born in Birkdale, Queensland on 13 October 1906. He attended Wynnum State High School.

Randall joined the Commonwealth public service in 1940, taking up a post at the Department of the Treasury. The following year, on 27 May, he enlisted to the Australian Imperial Force, spending most of the war in Western Australia and demobilising in November 1945.

After the war, Randall rejoined Treasury, and was appointed Secretary of the Treasury in 1966. He retired from his Secretary role in October 1971.

Randall died in Canberra on 15 November 1982, aged 76.

Awards
Randall was made a Knight Bachelor in 1964.

References

1906 births
1982 deaths
Australian Knights Bachelor
Secretaries of the Department of the Treasury of Australia
People from Redland City
Australian Army personnel of World War II
Australian Army soldiers